The Black Room is an American horror film written and directed by Rolfe Kanefsky. It stars Natasha Henstridge, Lukas Hassel and Lin Shaye.

Synopsis
Newlyweds Jennifer and Paul have moved into what is meant to become a dream home, only to discover that their basement contains a black room that houses a demonic presence that uses lust and arousal to conquer human souls.

Cast
 Natasha Henstridge as Jennifer
 Lukas Hassel as Paul
 Alex Rinehart as Dawn
 Lin Shaye as Miss Black
 Tiffany Shepis as Monica
 Robert Donavan as Oscar
 Caleb Scott as Howard
 Augie Duke as Karen

Production 
Filming took place during 2016. Esther Goodstein and David Skye served as producers, while Brian Perera executively produced.

Release
The Black Room received a limited theatrical release on April 28, 2017 in the United States, followed by a VOD release that same year. The production company released a trailer for the movie in the weeks preceding the limited theatrical run. FirstShowing.net was critical of the trailer, as they felt that "From the looks of it, this doesn't seem like anything particular special. There's new horror films being made all the time, and this one seems forgettable despite the marketing."

Soundtrack 
The film's score was created and performed by Savant, with additional tracks by artists Arthur Brown, Lynn Anderson, and Brainticket. Keith Emerson and Greg Lake also contributed to the soundtrack; their contribution was performed by The Royal Philharmonic Orchestra. The soundtrack was released via Cleopatra Records.

Reception
The Los Angeles Times stated that the film was "unabashedly trashy — with scene after scene of nudity and gore — but doesn’t offer much beyond sensation." Horror outlet HorrorNews.net was also critical, expressing sympathy for Hendstrige's acting career and writing "It’s filled with poor acting and some bad dialogue. The wonderful practical effects are wasted here. Stick a fork in this turkey, it’s done. Not recommended."

References

External links
 
 

2017 films
2017 horror films
American horror films
2010s English-language films
2010s American films